The Planning Ministry of the Palestinian National Authority is the branch of the Palestinian government, that is responsible for cross-sector planning, developing comprehensive development policies with the participation of all relevant Palestinian institutions and to coordinate sector planning in specific ministries, to ensure their consistency with cross-sector approaches and plans. Any plan has to be approved by the Palestinian National Authority Cabinet and then ratified by the Palestinian Legislative Council. The ministry was established in 2003, although it unofficially existed as the former Planning and International Cooperation Ministry. The current ministry has a relatively minor position in Palestinian politics and a minister was not appointed by Mahmoud Abbas after the establishment of an emergency government in June 2007.

Ministers

See also
Foreign Affairs Minister of the Palestinian National Authority
Finance Minister of the Palestinian National Authority
Interior Minister of the Palestinian National Authority
Education Minister of the Palestinian National Authority

External links
Official Ministry of Planning Website (West Bank)
Official Ministry of Planning Website (Gaza Strip)

References 

Planning ministries